The FIM Cross-Country Rallies World Championship was the premier championship of Rally raid racing, organized by the Fédération Internationale de Motocyclisme (FIM), from 1999 to 2021 (from 1999 and 2002 as World Cup).
Asides the main championship, there were World Cups for the following categories: Quads, Women, Junior, and over 450 cc.

The Cross-Country Rallies World Championship was contested for the first time in 1999. It was organized by FIM with the aim joining in a unique calendar the numerous cross-country rallies disputed all over the world in a totally uncoordinated way. The trophy awarded in early seasons was a simple "world cup" , but the large participation of drivers since the first edition pushed the FIM to set up a few years later a real "world championship".

A separate competition exists for "baja" style rally raids called the FIM Bajas World Cup.

From 2022, the cup merged with the FIA World Cup for Cross-Country Rallies to become the World Rally-Raid Championship.

Winners

Quads World Cup

Women's World Cup

In 2021 Anastasiya Nifontova competed as a neutral competitor using the designation MFR (Motorcycle Federation of Russia), as the Court of Arbitration for Sport upheld a ban on Russia competing at World Championships. The ban was implemented by the World Anti-Doping Agency in response to state-sponsored doping program of Russian athletes.

Junior World Cup

Open & 450cc World Cup

References

External links
 

 
Motorcycle off-road racing series
Fédération Internationale de Motocyclisme
Recurring sporting events established in 1999